The 1940 All-Ireland Minor Football Championship was the 12th staging of the All-Ireland Minor Football Championship, the Gaelic Athletic Association's premier inter-county Gaelic football tournament for boys under the age of 18.

Roscommon entered the championship as defending champions, however, they were defeated in the Connacht Championship.

On 22 September 1940, Louth won the championship following a 5–5 to 2–7 defeat of Mayo in the All-Ireland final. This was their second All-Ireland title and their first in four championship seasons.

Results

Connacht Minor Football Championship

Leinster Minor Football Championship

Munster Minor Football Championship

Ulster Minor Football Championship

All-Ireland Minor Football Championship
Semi-Finals

Final

References

1940
All-Ireland Minor Football Championship